Zhang Beichuan is a Chinese researcher, dermatologist, LGBT activist, and AIDS prevention specialist.  He originally studied dermatology under the dermatologist Qin Shide in Qingdao University, but decided to branch off and pursuit the study the study of LGBT issues after seeing his teacher being discriminated against based due to his teacher's sexual orientation. In 1994, he published the book Homosexual Love, the first comprehensive study on homosexuality in modern China. After publishing the book, he received around 1,000 letters from gay people all around China. These letters and the support of Qin Shide finally made him decide to quit his career as a dermatologist and start focusing on preventive healthcare for the homosexual population, especially in response to the AIDS pandemic. In 1998, Zhang created the health prevention project for gay people, "Friends", with the support of the Ford Foundation. In the same year, he published the monthly health resource pamphlet, "Friends Communications ". His presentation in the Xiangshan Science Conference encourage the Chinese Ministry of Health to divert funding to combat the spread of AIDS among gay men. In 2002, the United Nation praised the "Friends" project in their document about the AIDS pandemic. Zhang was awarded the Barry & Martin award for his work on AIDS prevention.

See also 
 HIV/AIDS in China
 Prevention of HIV/AIDS
 Homosexuality in China

References

External links 
 Blog of Zhang Beichuan 
 Digital Version of "Friends Communications"

Living people
Year of birth missing (living people)

Chinese dermatologists
Chinese LGBT rights activists